Panjab Singh is the  first and incumbent chancellor of Rani Lakshmi Bai Central Agriculural University, and the president of Foundation for Advancement of Agriculture and Rural development (FAARD Foundation). He has previously served as the 23rd Vice-Chancellor of Banaras Hindu University (2005-2008), and president National Academy of Agricultural Sciences (2017-2019).

See also 

 List of Vice-chancellors of Banaras Hindu University
 Rani Lakshmi Bai Central Agriculural University

References 

Banaras Hindu University
Vice Chancellors of Banaras Hindu University
Banaras Hindu University people
Year of birth missing (living people)
Living people